Patrick Gerry-Anthony Alcala Reichelt (born June 15, 1988) is a professional footballer who plays as a winger or a forward for Malaysia Super League club Kuala Lumpur City and the Philippines national team.

Club career
Reichelt started his football career in Germany, playing for various clubs including Nordberliner SC 74, Reinickendorfer Füchse, Energie Cottbus II, and TSG Neustrelitz

Then United Football League (ULF) side Global F.C. was the first Philippine-based club Reichelt played for, helping Global win its first title in his first season with the club in 2012.

He played for Singhtarua F.C. of the Thai Division 1 League for the 2013 season.

Reichelt moved back to the Philippines to play for then UFL-side Ceres F.C. He stayed with the club, which became Ceres–Negros F.C. when it joined the Philippines Football League in 2017, for five seasons.

Melaka United signed in Reichelt in January 2019 to play for the club in the Malaysia Super League. He became Melaka's top scorer for the 2019 season and had an opportunity to continue playing for the club for at least another season. However Reichelt returned to Thailand in 2020 to join Thai League 1 club Suphanburi. He sustained a head injury in the early parts of the 2020 season and had to play with protective headgear upon his return from injury.

International career
Reichelt represents the Philippines at international level. He first became involved with the national team in 2011, as a participant of a training camp in Düren, Germany. However an anterior cruciate ligament (ACL) tear on the first day of the training camp forced his exclusion from the 2014 FIFA World Cup qualifiers and the Southeast Asian Games for that year.

He made his debut for the Philippines at the age of 24 on 5 September 2012 against Cambodia which ended in a scoreless draw.

Being a vital part of the Philippine national team since then, he played in 3 editions of the AFF Championship (2012, 2014, 2018) and helped the team qualify for the very first time for the AFC Asian Cup in 2019. He started in all three games for the national team in the United Arab Emirates .

International goals
Scores and results list the Philippines' goal tally first.

Honours
Global
UFL Division 1: 2012

Philippines
Philippine Peace Cup: 2012, 2013

References

External links

1988 births
Living people
German footballers
Filipino footballers
Filipino expatriate footballers
Philippines international footballers
Citizens of the Philippines through descent
German sportspeople of Filipino descent
Association football wingers
FC Energie Cottbus II players
Füchse Berlin Reinickendorf players
Global Makati F.C. players
Ceres–Negros F.C. players
TSG Neustrelitz players
Patrick Reichelt
Patrick Reichelt
Expatriate footballers in Thailand
Filipino expatriate sportspeople in Thailand
2019 AFC Asian Cup players